Andrew Derek Cocup Sr. (born 7 June 1973), known professionally as Andy Cato, is an English musician, record producer and DJ who is currently one half of the electronic music band Groove Armada, the other half being Tom Findlay. He was also involved with Rachel Foster in Weekend Players, another electronic dance group, between 2001 and 2004. His stage name of Cato derives from Cato Road in Clapham, South London, where he lived.

Early life
Cato grew up in Badsworth, near Pontefract, and played the trombone in the Grimethorpe Colliery Band, as well as the Doncaster Youth Jazz Orchestra and won the Young Jazz Musician of the Year Award in 1996. He was educated at Queen Elizabeth Grammar School, a private school for boys in Wakefield, followed by Merton College, Oxford, where he read Modern History. At school, he was a prolific musician, frequently performing and leading school shows such as the Carol concert or as a pianist at school assembly. He often wrote his own songs e.g. "Christmas means to me - presents round the tree", from an early age.

Groove Armada

After Oxford, he moved to London, where he began acting as a disc jockey at nightclubs such as Fabric where he started in the upstairs bar, and composing music. He set up the label Skinny Malinky, which produced records under various aliases included Big C, Mother's Pride, Vadis, Beat Foundation, Fatback Boogaloo and Qattara (with Alex Whitcombe).

He formed the successful Groove Armada after he met Tom Findlay in 1994 in Cambridge, through a common friend who was his girlfriend (and now his wife), Jo, whom he met at Oxford. In London they had a dance night called Captain Sensual at the Helm of the Groove Armada. In 2003 they started the Lovebox Festival, named after the club night they started in London venue 93 Feet East in 2002.

Personal life
In 2008, Cato moved with his family to Gascony in France. In 2013, they acquired a 100-hectare farm, where they now grow organic no-till crops and raise livestock in pasture. Cato is now a full-time farmer, but he still finds time to DJ, with occasional gigs in the UK and Ibiza and regular DIY releases.
Groove Armada are on a farewell tour of Australia and New Zealand in 2022.

References

External links
 Groove Armada website
 Making ringtones for O2 in 2005
 Jazz Weekly interview
 Sydney Morning Herald 2003 article

1973 births
Living people
People from Pontefract
Musicians from Wakefield
English keyboardists
English electronic musicians
English DJs
English record producers
Club DJs
Big beat musicians
People educated at Queen Elizabeth Grammar School, Wakefield
Alumni of Merton College, Oxford
Electronic dance music DJs
21st-century trombonists
21st-century British male musicians